Faina Chiang Fang-liang (born Faina Ipat'evna Vakhreva (15 May 1916 – 15 December 2004) was the First Lady of the Republic of China on Taiwan from 1978 to 1988 as the wife of President Chiang Ching-kuo.

Early life 
On 15 May 1916, Faina was born near Orsha, then part of the Russian Empire, now in Belarus. Faina was orphaned at a young age and raised by her older sister Anna.

Career 
At age 16, as a member of the Soviet Union's Communist Youth League, Faina worked at the Ural Heavy Machinery Plant, where she met Chiang Ching-kuo, her supervisor.

Biography 

In December 1936, Joseph Stalin granted Chiang's return to China. By some other account, however, the couple fled fearing arrest of Chiang Ching-kuo. After the couple was received by Chiang Kai-shek and his wife Soong Mei-ling in Hangzhou, they traveled to the Chiang home in Xikou, Zhejiang, where they held a second marriage ceremony. Fang-liang stayed behind to live with Chiang Ching-kuo's mother, Mao Fumei. She was assigned a tutor to learn Mandarin Chinese, but she learned the local Ningbo dialect of Wu Chinese instead. She reportedly got along well with Mao Fumei and did her own housework.

As a First lady 
When Chiang Ching-kuo became President, Fang-liang rarely performed the traditional roles of First Lady. That is partly due to her lack of formal education; her husband also encouraged her not to get into politics. She largely stayed out of the public spotlight and little was ever known of her in an anti-communist atmosphere in the government.  She never returned to Russia, and traveled abroad only three times in the last 50 years of her life, all to visit her children and their families. In 1992, she received a visit from a delegation including future president Alexander Lukashenko, a mayor of Minsk (the capital of Belarus) at the time. It was the only time that she made contact with anyone from her homeland as First Lady.

Personal life 
Faina met Chiang Ching-kuo, son of Chiang Kai-shek, while working at the Ural Heavy Machine Plant in Sverdlovsk, Russian SFSR. On 15 March 1935, aged 18, Faina married him.

Children 
On 14 December 1935, their first son Chiang Hsiao-wen was born in the Soviet Union. Each of her three younger children were born in different parts of China, reflecting turbulent years as an official of China. Faina had four children:

 Chiang Hsiao-wen (b. 1935, Sverdlovsk)
 Chiang Hsiao-chang (b. 1938 in Nanchang)
 Chiang Hsiao-wu (b. 1945 in Chekiang)
 Chiang Hsiao-yung (b. 1948 in Shanghai)

All her children were sent to study in foreign universities – Hsiao-wen to West Point and Park College, MO, Hsiao-wu to Munich, West Germany and the remaining children to the United States. All three sons died shortly after Ching-kuo's death in 1988: Hsiao-wen in April 1989, Hsiao-wu in July 1991, and Hsiao-yung in December 1996. Fang-liang then lived in the suburbs of Taipei. She received occasional visitors, such as some prominent politicians who went to pay their respects every few years. In the Taiwanese media, if she ever received coverage, she was depicted as a virtuous wife who never complained and endured her loneliness with dignity.

Death 
Chiang died of respiratory and cardiac failure stemming from lung cancer in Taipei Veterans General Hospital at the age of 88 (or 89 according to East Asian age reckoning).

Legacy 
Chiang's funeral was held on 27 December 2004, with President Chen Shui-bian and Vice President Annette Lu in attendance. Kuomintang politicians Wang Jin-pyng, Lin Cheng-chih, P. K. Chiang, and Ma Ying-jeou draped her casket with the Kuomintang party flag, and Kuomintang party elders Lee Huan, Hau Pei-tsun, Chiu Chuang-huan, and Shih Chi-yang draped her casket with the ROC national flag.
Chiang was cremated and her ashes taken to her husband's temporary mausoleum in Touliao, Taoyuan County (now Taoyuan City). They were buried together in the Wuchih Mountain Military Cemetery.

See also 
 Cafe Astoria
 Franziska Donner

References

Bibliography

External links
Love to Fang-liang - the Chiang Family Album

1916 births
2004 deaths
People from Orsha District
People from Vitebsk Governorate
Chiang Kai-shek family
First ladies of the Republic of China
Soviet emigrants to China
Taiwanese people of Belarusian descent
Deaths from respiratory failure